Arthur Herbert Perowne (1930 – 10 January 2018) was an English amateur golfer. He played in the Walker Cup in 1949, 1953 and 1959.

Perowne won the English Boys' under–18 stroke play title (the Carris Trophy) in 1946. He reached the semi-final of the 1953 Amateur Championship, losing to the American Harvie Ward. In 1958 he shared the Berkshire Trophy with Guy Wolstenholme and won the Brabazon Trophy. Later in 1958 he played in the first Eisenhower Trophy where the Great Britain and Ireland team took the bronze medal.

Amateur wins
1946 Carris Trophy
1947 Swedish Amateur Championship
1958 Berkshire Trophy (tie with Guy Wolstenholme), Brabazon Trophy
1964 Norfolk Open Championship
Norfolk Amateur Championship 11 times 1948, 1951 to 1958, 1960, 1961

Results in major championships

Note: Perowne only played in The Open Championship.

CUT = missed the half-way cut

Team appearances
Walker Cup (representing Great Britain & Ireland): 1949, 1953, 1959
Eisenhower Trophy (representing Great Britain & Ireland): 1958
Amateurs–Professionals Match (representing the Amateurs): 1956, 1958

References

English male golfers
Amateur golfers
Sportspeople from Norwich
1930 births
2018 deaths